Search for Danger is a 1949 American crime film directed by Jack Bernhard and starring John Calvert, Albert Dekker and Myrna Dell. The film was the last of three made by the low-budget Film Classics company featuring Calvert as The Falcon who had previously been played by George Sanders and Tom Conway for RKO. The film's art direction was by Boris Leven.

Plot
Mike Waring, a private detective in Los Angeles whose nickname is "The Falcon," is on a case. He follows a man named Andrews to a hotel, then reports back to his clients, club owners Kirk and Gregory, where the man, their business partner, can be found.

They pay Waring a $500 fee, whereupon Wilma Rogers, who works at the club and likes Andrews, expresses her displeasure with Waring for informing on him. She also tips off Andrews that his partners are coming. Kirk and Gregory return, angry not only that they can't find Andrews or the $100,000 he embezzled, but that a hotel clerk, Perry, was under the impression that Waring left Andrews' room carrying what appeared to be a lot of money.

Waring believes the club owners are trying to frame him. Elaine Carson offers to help, but before long Waring becomes suspicious of her behavior, too. Waring eventually is able to locate the missing money, which he gives to a police lieutenant, Cooper, for safekeeping. Then he exposes the real culprit behind Andrews' murder and the theft, Perry, the clerk.

Cast
 John Calvert as Michael 'The Falcon' Waring 
 Albert Dekker as Kirk 
 Myrna Dell as Wilma Rogers 
 Ben Welden as Gregory 
 Douglas Fowley as The Inspector 
 Michael Mark as Mr. Perry 
 James Griffith as Lt. Cooper 
 Ann Cornell as Elaine Carson 
 Mauritz Hugo as Larry Andrews 
 Peter Brocco as Morris Jason 
 Peter Michael as Jailer 
 Jack Daley as Drunk 
 Billy Nelson as Gunman in Back Seat of Car

References

Bibliography
 Hardy, Phil. The BFI Companion to Crime. University of California Press, 1997.

External links
 
 
 
 

1949 films
American crime films
1949 crime films
Films directed by Jack Bernhard
Film Classics films
American black-and-white films
The Falcon (film character) films
Films scored by Karl Hajos
1940s English-language films
1940s American films